Thiorhodococcus modestalkaliphilus is a Gram-negative, phototrophic and motile bacterium from the genus of Thiorhodococcus which has been isolated from sediments from the Chilika Lagoon in India.

References 

Chromatiales
Bacteria described in 2010